Ker v. Illinois, 119 U.S. 436 (1886), is a United States Supreme Court case in which the Court unanimously held that a fugitive kidnapped from abroad could not claim any violation of the Constitution, laws or treaties of the United States. 

The incident that led to this decision involved a Pinkerton Detective Agency agent, Henry Julian, was hired by the federal government to collect a larcenist, Frederick Ker, who had fled to Peru. Although Julian had the necessary extradition papers—the two governments had negotiated an extradition treaty a decade earlier—he found that there was no official to meet his request due to the recent Chilean military occupation of Lima. Rather than return home empty-handed, Julian kidnapped the fugitive, with assistance from Chilean forces, and placed him on a U.S. vessel heading back to the United States.

A very important provision in all these US Supreme Court rulings on international extradition is that the extradited defendant must be tried by an impartial jury, according to the Sixth Amendment of the US Constitution.

See also
List of United States Supreme Court cases, volume 119
Ker-Frisbie Doctrine
United States v. Rauscher, 
Frisbie v. Collins, 
United States v. Verdugo-Urquidez, 
United States v. Alvarez-Machain,

Further reading

References

External links

Pinkerton (detective agency)
United States Supreme Court cases
United States Supreme Court cases of the Waite Court
Criminal cases in the Waite Court
Extradition case law
1886 in United States case law
United States criminal investigation case law
Peru–United States relations